Ivan Kerzelli or Cherzelli (also known as I. I. Kerzelli, or Iosif Kertsel, Russian: Иван Керцелли, И. И. Керцелли, or Иосиф Керцель) was an opera composer and conductor in Imperial Russia of 18th century.

He was a representative of big family of Kerzelli musicians of Italian, Czech or Austrian origin the information is vague and inconsistent settled in 18th-century Russia. He is regarded as a composer of a few famous operas.

Selected works 
Lyubovnik - koldun (Любовник - колдун - The Lover-Magician, one-act opera, text by Nikolai Nikolev, 1772 Moscow),
Rozana i Lyubim (Розана и Любим - Rozana und Lyubim, four-act opera, text by Nikolai Nikolev,  1778, Moscow)
Derevenskiy vorozheya (Деревенский ворожея - The Village Wizard, text by Vasily Maikov after Rousseau, c. 1777 Moscow). Overture and songs were printed in Moscow 1778. They were the first opera fragments printed in Russia.
Guljanye ili sadovnik kuskovskoy (Гулянье или садовник кусковской - Promenade or the Gardener from Kuskovo, text by Vasili Kolychev, 1780 or 1781 Kuskovo, Theatre of Count Nikolay Sheremetyev).

Russian opera composers
Male opera composers
Russian male classical composers
Russian conductors (music)
Russian male conductors (music)
Year of birth missing
Year of death missing
Ivan